The O.S. Popov Odesa National Academy of Telecommunications is a public academy in the city of Odesa, Ukraine.

Faculty 
The faculty consists of 465 teachers. The staff consists of 44 professors with a Doctorate of Science and 328 PhDs in fields with recognition from the Academics of Branch Academies, Laureates of State International Awards, Honored Statesmen of Science and Techniques and workers of the Ukrainian Higher School.

Facilities 
Today, more than 7,000 students are studying at the academy. The academy has a brainstorm experimental base and close ties with IT and telecommunication organizations. The educational process and scientific research takes place primarily in specialized labs.

Organization 
The academy is structured into six departments:

 Scientific Research Institute of Information Communication;
 Educational and Scientific Institute of Radio and Television Electronics;
 Computer Technologies, Automation, and Logistics, Educational and Research Institute;
 Educational and Scientific Institute of Economics and Management;
 Educational and Scientific Institute of Problems of Information Society;
 Department of Telecommunications Systems.

References 

Educational institutions established in 1920
Education in Odesa
Technical universities and colleges in Ukraine
National universities in Ukraine
1920 establishments in Ukraine